Gallery Stratford is a public art gallery located in Stratford, Ontario, Canada. Founded in 1967, the Gallery has established itself as one of the region’s leading art galleries, organizing exhibitions of local, national and international visual artists.  The gallery showcases contemporary work reflecting current changes in art making and pieces from its collection.

Mission statement
Gallery Stratford’s mission is to engage the community of Stratford and its visitors in the advancement and appreciation of the visual arts in order to inspire and enrich lives.

History
Built in 1883 on the banks of the Avon River, Stratford’s original pump house with its elaborate architectural elements and picturesque setting is a perfect location today for the city’s public gallery of visual art - Gallery Stratford.  Located at 54 Romeo Street, the building’s Queen Anne Style architecture contains Gothic Revival Style elements that are seen elsewhere in the community. The character of the former Water Works building is quite in keeping with the designs of George F. Durand, a prominent London, Ontario architect who designed the Perth County Courthouse.

Durand, one of Ontario’s leading architects of the time, felt, very strongly, that architecture was an art, not an engineering project; his structures reflecting the combination of more than one style of design associated with the Queen Anne Style.  Features such as pairings of lancet, or narrow pointed windows and the polychromatic effects in the brickwork are characteristic of Durand. Remnants of the once monumental entrance-way, with its wedge-shaped gable and the arch within an arch motif, reflect Durand’s way of thinking.

While the Gallery’s exterior appears cottage-like, the building was never designed for domestic living. In its original state, the pump room had 16 foot high walls decorated, in places, by a "wandering artist." It had a brick floor and an oiled hardwood ceiling.  Two other men responsible for the construction of the Waterworks in Stratford were W. Perry, Jr., who was responsible for putting the pumping machines in place and William Roberts, who was the building contractor. Roberts was not only a builder, but was also a brick manufacturer and the pump house was built using his "celebrated superior white patent pressed brick."

By 1964, the historic building became obsolete when the Stratford Public Utilities Commission opened a new pump house across the street; there was a possibility that the buildings would be demolished. The Stratford Art Society (founded in 1945) prepared a feasibility plan to convert the buildings into a prestigious art gallery.  In 1966, the Stratford Art Society became known as the Stratford Art Association, and its director was Robert Ihrig. With receipt of financial backing in 1967 from Rothman’s Pall Mall of Canada Limited, The Stratford Art Association renovated and opened the doors of the Rothman Art Gallery.

The Rothman Art Gallery was an active cultural centre for the region, exhibiting emerging Canadian and International artists. In partnership with the Stratford Festival a ‘Music at Midnight’ series flourished at the Rothman Art Gallery from 1969 until 1976; presenting unscheduled appearances by the Festivals guest musicians and chamber concerts by members of the resident Festival orchestra.  By 1974, Rothman’s underwent internal organizational changes that altered the way the company supported the arts. Rothmans eventually removed themselves from this project, but not before spending in the neighborhood of a million dollars to develop a viable art gallery.

Withdrawal of Rothman’s along with its financial support over the next three years resulted in the gallery’s new name – Gallery Stratford. In 1985, Gallery Stratford’s unique architectural exterior was recognized with the City of Stratford designating it a Heritage Building.

Permanent Collection

The Permanent Collection of Gallery Stratford includes over 1000 works of art. The majority of the collection consists of works on paper by Canadian artists: prints, drawings, and paintings. Many of the works were purchased in the early years of the Rothman’s Art Gallery by the women’s volunteer committees. In more recent years, works have been donated by artists who have had exhibitions at Gallery Stratford.

Education

Gallery Stratford involves the community in its programming to facilitate visual arts awareness for adults and children.  Programs change seasonally, with studio classes ranging from oil painting, drawing and illustration to photography and printmaking.

For students, class visits to Gallery Stratford are interactive and curriculum-based; encouraging students to find pleasure and meaning in art, and to think critically about art work.  Students are guided during their visits by staff or docents who lead discussions on the content and artistic qualities of selected original works of art. Programs change regularly to complement current exhibitions.

The gallery also features an open community studio, stocked with creative materials. The community studio guided activities reinforce key concepts introduced in the exhibitions, helping participants to connect with the art work.

During the second Sunday of each month from September to June, Gallery Stratford offers Family Art Sundays.  This free program runs from 1-3pm and is led by a Gallery educator.

Through a partnership with the Toronto International Film Festival Group, Gallery Stratford offers a special selection of films on the third Monday of every month from September to May at the Stratford Cinemas. The film series allows the audience unique access to view Canadian and international films in limited distribution.

Gallery Stratford's Arts Alive program offers drawing, photography, animation, painting, sculptures, collage projects and much more.  Arts Alive offers full-day and half-day weekly programs during the month of July each year for children aged 3 to 14.

Scholarships
Annually, Gallery Stratford awards a scholarship to Perth Huron high school students who go on to study visual arts after high school. The Ela Moll Scholarship was founded by members of the Stratford Community and the Stratford Art Association to commemorate the death of Ela Moll (1950–1969), and to ensure that Stratford area youth will continue to be encouraged in the arts.

Ela Moll was a young Stratford artist, who was killed in an accident. A prolific artist from a very early age, he was rarely idle and produced hundreds of art works, including ink, etchings, oils/acrylic, silk screens, and sculpture. Moll displayed an extraordinary imagination and a great creative ability, manifested not only in his own work but his leadership to the young people of Stratford.

See also
 List of art museums
 List of museums in Ontario

References
Gallery Stratford

External links

 

Art museums and galleries in Ontario
Buildings and structures in Stratford, Ontario
Tourist attractions in Perth County, Ontario
Art galleries established in 1967
1967 establishments in Ontario